Makhliyo Sarikova is an Uzbekistani women's football striker currently playing for SSVSM-Kairat Almaty in the Kazakhstani Championship. She made her UEFA Champions League in October 2013, scoring one goal against Arsenal LFC.

She is a member of the Uzbekistani national team. She scored five of Uzbekistan's six goals in the 2012 Summer Olympics AFC Qualifiers' Second Round. She has also played for the national futsal team, winning a bronze in the 2007 Asian Indoor Games.

International goals

See also
List of Uzbekistan women's international footballers

References

External links

1990 births
Living people
Sportspeople from Tashkent
Women's association football forwards
Uzbekistani women's footballers
Uzbekistan women's international footballers
Uzbekistani expatriate footballers
Uzbekistani expatriate sportspeople in Kazakhstan
Expatriate footballers in Kazakhstan
Uzbekistani women's futsal players
CSHVSM-Kairat players